Matteo Cardinali (born 28 June 2001) is an Italian professional footballer who plays as a goalkeeper for  club Latina.

Club career
Born in Rome Cardinali started his career in local club A.S. Roma.In June 2018, he was scouted by English clubs Liverpool and Arsenal. 

He was promoted to first team for the 2018–19 season. In July 2020 he extended his contract with the club. 

On 12 August 2020, Cardinali was loaned to Serie C club Matelica. He made his prrofessional debut on 27 September against Triestina.

On 19 August 2021, he signed with Serie C club Latina.

International career
Cardinali was a youth international for Italy.

References

External links
 
 

1994 births
Living people
Footballers from Naples
Italian footballers
Association football goalkeepers
Serie C players
A.S. Roma players
S.S. Matelica Calcio 1921 players
Latina Calcio 1932 players
Italy youth international footballers